Awalycaeus akiratadai is a species of land snail, a terrestrial gastropod mollusk in the family Cyclophoridae.

This species is endemic to Japan.

References

Molluscs of Japan
Awalycaeus
Gastropods described in 1982
Taxonomy articles created by Polbot